Scott Kelly may refer to:

 Scott Kelly (astronaut) (born 1964), American astronaut
 Scott Kelly (musician) (born 1967), American musician
 Scott Kelly (politician) (1927–2005), American politician

See also
Kelly Scott (disambiguation)